The Montana Magic were a minor professional ice hockey team that played in Billings, Montana, as a member of the defunct Central Hockey League (CHL) in the 1983–84 season. They filled the void left by the departure of the major junior Billings Bighorns in 1982. After their first and only season in the CHL, posting a 20–52–4 record and missing the playoffs, the league folded and the team consequently disbanded. They would be replaced in 1985 by the semi-professional Billings Marlboros of the Continental Hockey League, a league that also folded after the Billings team played in only one season in 1986.

As a minor league team, the Magic served as a National Hockey League affiliate whose parent teams were the St. Louis Blues and Edmonton Oilers. Notable players for the Magic included Reggie Leach, Blair MacDonald, Don Murdoch, Stan Weir, and Alain Vigneault.

Season-by-season record
Note: GP = Games played, W = Wins, L = Losses, T = Ties, Pts = Points, GF = Goals for, GA = Goals against, PIM = Penalties in minutes

References

External links
HockeyDB Montana Magic page

Defunct ice hockey teams in the United States
Central Professional Hockey League teams
Ice hockey clubs established in 1983
Sports clubs disestablished in 1984
Ice hockey teams in Montana
1983 establishments in Montana
1984 disestablishments in Montana
Sports in Billings, Montana
St. Louis Blues minor league affiliates
Edmonton Oilers minor league affiliates